"I Want You" is a single from Common's album Finding Forever. It is produced by will.i.am, and has samples from Minnie Riperton's "Baby, This Love I Have", and Bob James' version of "Feel Like Makin' Love" which was written by Eugene McDaniels. It peaked at #112 in the US Bubbling Under chart and serviced to radio.

Track listing
UK CD:
 "I Want You"
 "Drivin' Me Wild" (featuring Lily Allen) (live)
 "I Used to Love H.E.R." (live)
 "Break My Heart" (live)

  Live tracks  courtesy of Nissan Live sets on Yahoo Music, 2007.

Music video
The video was directed by Sanji and actress Kerry Washington, who also co-starred in the video. It features Kanye West (who was the executive producer of the album), Derek Luke, Serena Williams and Alicia Keys.

The music video premiered on the internet on October 23, 2007. The video can be watched on Common's official website.

Personnel
Produced by will.i.am
Recorded by will.i.am and Padriac Kerin at Record Plant
Mixed by Dylan Dresdow at Chalice Studio in Los Angeles
Chorus vocals by will.i.am
Background vocals by Rhea Williams
Keys and synth by Omar Edwards

Notes
Common and Alicia Keys also appear in the 2006 movie Smokin' Aces together, in which their characters eventually become attracted to one another.
Common and Alicia Keys also play lovers in her video for "Like You'll Never See Me Again," which appears on her 2007 album As I Am.
Common makes a lyrical reference to Pete Rock & C.L. Smooth's hit single "They Reminisce Over You (T.R.O.Y.)".

Chart positions

External links
 Billboard.com
 "I Want You" music video

2006 songs
2007 singles
Common (rapper) songs
Will.i.am songs
Music videos directed by Sanji (director)
Song recordings produced by will.i.am
GOOD Music singles
Songs written by Common (rapper)
Songs written by will.i.am
Songs written by Gene McDaniels